A list of books and essays about John Huston:

Huston